The Poet may refer to:

The Poet (album), an album by Bobby Womack
The Poet (essay), an essay by Ralph Waldo Emerson
The Poet (1956 film), a Soviet drama film
The Poet (1998 film)
The Poet (2007 film), a Canadian drama film
The Poet (novel), a novel by Michael Connelly
The Poet (painting), a painting by Russian-French artist Marc Chagall
The Poets, a band from Glasgow
The Poet, a band from Puerto Rico
Peter Costa (poker player), a professional poker player whose nickname is "The Poet"

See also
Poet (disambiguation)